Bryotropha plebejella is a moth of the family Gelechiidae. It is found in Portugal, Spain, southern France, Corsica, Sardinia, Sicily, Croatia, North Macedonia, Greece, the Aegean Islands, Crete, Cyprus, Turkey, Syria, Israel, Algeria, Tunisia, Libya, Madeira and the Canary Islands.

The wingspan is 10–13 mm. The forewings are brown, heavily mixed with ochreous and often with an orange tinge. The hindwings are pale ochreous at the base, but darker towards the apex. Adults have been recorded on wing from April to late September, probably in two generations per year.

References

Moths described in 1847
plebejella
Moths of Europe
Moths of Asia
Moths of Africa